Zachary Wong Wai-yin (born 22 December 1957, Hong Kong) is a former Yuen Long District Councillor (representing Nam Ping) for the Meeting Point and later Democratic Party and a former member of the Legislative Council of Hong Kong.

He joined the Association for the Rights of the Elderly, founded by Yeung Sum and Frederick Fung, in 1982. He was elected chairman of the association in 1991. In 1988, he joined Meeting Point and became a member of its Central Committee in 1991. He was also part of the Joint Committee on the Promotion of Democratic Government. He organised most of the rallies, petitions and 50-hour fasting strike at the Star Ferry Pier in 1989 for a faster pace of democracy.

He was first elected to the Yuen Long District Board in 1988 and replaced Tai Chin-wah as a LegCo member in a by-election in 1991. He stood in the Legislative Council elections in 1998 and again in 2012 but did not get elected.

In 2020, Wong became chairman of the Yuen Long District Council, after the pro-Beijing DAB was defeated in the 2019 Hong Kong local elections. 

On 21 October 2021, Wong was unseated from his position both member and chairman of Yuen Long District Council, after he was disqualified together with other 16 district councillors.

References

1957 births
Living people
District councillors of Yuen Long District
Democratic Party (Hong Kong) politicians
Meeting Point politicians
HK LegCo Members 1991–1995
HK LegCo Members 1995–1997